The International Patient Safety Goals (IPSG) were developed in 2006 by the Joint Commission International (JCI). The goals were adapted from the JCAHO's National Patient Safety Goals.

Compliance with IPSG has been monitored in JCI-accredited hospitals since January 2006. The JCI recommends targeted solution tools to help hospital to meet IPSG standards.

Versions 
The Joint Commission has updated the IPSGs over time:

2006 version 

 Identify patients correctly
 Improve effective communication
 Improve the safety of high-alert medications
 Eliminate wrong-site, wrong-patient, wrong-procedure surgery
 Reduce the risk of health-acquired infections
 Reduce the risk of patient harm from falls.

2011 version 

 IPSG.1 Identify Patients Correctly
 IPSG.2 Improve Effective Communication
 IPSG.3 Improve the Safety of High-Alert Medications
 IPSG.4 Ensure Correct-Site, Correct-Procedure, Correct-Patient Surgery
 IPSG.5 Reduce the Risk of Health Care–Associated Infections
 IPSG.6 Reduce the Risk of Patient Harm Resulting from Falls.

2017–2023 versions 

 Goal 1: Identify patients correctly.
 Goal 2: Improve effective communication.
 Goal 3: Improve the safety of high-alert medications.
 Goal 4: Ensure safe surgery.
 Goal 5: Reduce the risk of health care-associated infections.
 Goal 6: Reduce the risk of patient harm resulting from falls.

References 

Patient safety
Health care quality